Kerry Louise Jury (born 1968) is a female former athlete who competed for England.

Athletics career
She was the British champion in 1996 after winning the British heptathlon title.

She represented England in the heptathlon event, at the 1998 Commonwealth Games in Kuala Lumpur, Malaysia.

References

1968 births
Living people
English female athletes
Athletes (track and field) at the 1998 Commonwealth Games
English heptathletes
Commonwealth Games competitors for England